John Tveiten (15 November 1933 – 23 November 1994) was a Norwegian wrestler. He competed in the men's Greco-Roman bantamweight at the 1960 Summer Olympics.

References

External links
 

1933 births
1994 deaths
Norwegian male sport wrestlers
Olympic wrestlers of Norway
Wrestlers at the 1960 Summer Olympics
People from Notodden
Sportspeople from Vestfold og Telemark
20th-century Norwegian people